Scornicești is a town in Olt County, Romania, with a population of 11,766. The town administers 13 villages (Bălțați, Bircii, Chițeasca, Constantinești, Jitaru, Mărgineni-Slobozia, Mihăilești-Popești, Mogoșești, Negreni, Piscani, Rusciori, Șuica and Teiuș) and has a total area of 170 km² (65 sq. mi.), being the locality with the largest area in the county of Olt, surpassing even its capital Slatina. Scornicești is situated in the historical region of Muntenia. It officially became a town in 1989, as a result of the Romanian rural systematization program.

History

Scornicești was the birthplace of communist leader Nicolae Ceaușescu, who lived there until the age of 11, when he left for Bucharest to become a shoemaker. During his dictatorship, Ceaușescu wanted to make Scornicești a "model town" to house the newly created "Socialist Man". Consequently, in 1988, he began his plan by demolishing the traditional village houses and replacing them with apartment buildings, and changed the town's status from "village" to "city" (however, the bulldozers did not destroy Ceauşescu's birth home, which is now one of the local attractions - see on WikiMapia).

Ceaușescu also built a large stadium (with a capacity of 18,000 spectators) for the local football team, FC Olt, which, with the help of the Ceaușescus, was promoted to Divizia A. Nowadays, the team plays in the Olt County Championship.

The Scornicești Solar Park power system of solar panels is located in the town.

Natives
Radu Băldescu
Ion Barbu (footballer, born 1977)
Nicolae Ceaușescu
Valentin Coșereanu
Emil Dică

References
  Florian Bichir, "Scornicești, oaza de capitalism", Evenimentul Zilei, 25 January 2004
  Alex Nedea, Catalin Pruteanu, "Scornicești, again a village", Jurnalul Național, 21 July 2005

Notes

External links

Towns in Romania
Populated places in Olt County
Localities in Muntenia